Padina is a village in Serbia in the municipality of Kovačica. Majority of the population are Slovaks (96.78%).

Geography and climate

Padina lies in the middle of South Banat, at the border of Deliblato's shoal, on 52.75 km2, and in a southeast-northwest course. Geographical width of village is 45°7' N and 20°44' E. Altitude is between 105 and 120 meters above sea level (the church is on 111 m). Its name means slope or downhill. Padina covers 13% of Kovačica municipality, that is parting of the ways of roads to Belgrade, Zrenjanin, Novi Sad and Vršac.

System of valleys surrounding Padina has two directions, which cross on southern part called BAUK. Northern part is called Upper valley (Horná Dolina), and southern - Lower valley (Dolná Dolina).

Characteristic of Padina are large differences between summer and winter temperatures and low precipitation. July is the warmest month with average temperature about 22°C, and January is the coldest month with average about -1°C. Divergence between the lowest and the highest absolutely measured temperature is 70°C. 

The highest precipitation is in May and June and also in November and December. It totals between 650 and 700 mm of rain per year. 

The wind, which often blows from southeast is called "koshava". Košava blows from Montenegro for one to seven days (or even longer) with a speed of 100 km/h. It is most frequent in spring and autumn. Northern wind is dry, like koshava, but much colder. It comes in winter months and brings the coldest and driest weather. 

Underground water is being found in depths about 30 meters. On deeper places water is more clear, and people are supplied from there. The soil in Padina is muddy.

History
Padina was first settled by Romanians and later by Serbs but these settlements were abandoned. The current village was founded in 1806 by Slovak immigrants. There were two waves of Slovak immigration, each containing 80 families. The second wave came two years after the foundation of the village by the first wave. 

The settlement was initiated by Archduke Ludwig to strengthen the Military Border between Austrian and Ottoman Empires. The official name was related to the initiator - Ludwigsdorf in German or Lájosfalva in Hungarian (both meaning Ludwig's village). The inhabitants, however, kept calling it Padina.

In the beginning, the settlers had problem with drinkable water, as it is being found deep underground and the soil is unstable. The archduke promised them to build wells, which unfortunately took many years (until 1817) to fulfill. Thus in the first years of settlement, the settlers were  depending on wells in Kovačica several kilometres away.

Name
"Padina" is a Slavic word for "slope".

Historical population
1961: 6,197
1971: 6,362
1981: 6,367
1991: 6,076

See also
List of places in Serbia
List of cities, towns and villages in Vojvodina

References
Slobodan Ćurčić, Broj stanovnika Vojvodine, Novi Sad, 1996.

External links

Populated places in Serbian Banat
Populated places in South Banat District
Slovak communities in Serbia
Kovačica